Vohralík is a Czech surname. Notable people with the surname include:

 Karel Vohralík (1945–1998), Czech ice hockey player
 Václav Vohralík (1892–1985), Czech middle-distance runner

Czech-language surnames